Buhanda is an administrative ward in Kigoma-Ujiji District of Kigoma Region in Tanzania. 
In 2016 the Tanzania National Bureau of Statistics report there were 8,397 people in the ward, from 7,629 in 2012.

Villages / neighborhoods 
The ward has 4 villages and neighborhoods.
 Masanga
 Mgeo
 Msufini
 Mungonya

References

Wards of Kigoma Region